Ivanjševci is a Slovene place name that may refer to:

 Ivanjševci, Moravske Toplice, a village in the Municipality of Moravske Toplice, northeastern Slovenia
 Ivanjševci ob Ščavnici, a village in the Municipality of Gornja Radgona, northeastern Slovenia